William Thomas Collins (June 30, 1886 - September 4, 1961) was an American politician, lawyer, and jurist who served as acting mayor of New York City for one day on December 31, 1925, after the retirement of John Francis Hylan. He was a member of the Democratic Party and served as the president of the New York City Board of Aldermen before becoming acting mayor. After serving as acting mayor, he went on to serve as a justice from the 1st district of the New York Supreme Court from 1928 to 1945.

References 

Mayors of New York City
1886 births
1961 deaths
New York Supreme Court Justices
Fordham University alumni
Burials at Calvary Cemetery (Queens)
20th-century American judges
20th-century American politicians